Den Chai station is a railway station located in Den Chai Subdistrict, Den Chai District, Phrae. It is a Class 1 railway station and is the main station for Phrae Province, as there is no rail service to Phrae City. It is also the station to alight for passengers heading to Nan Province.

History
Den Chai Station was opened in 1912 during the King Rama VI's reign as Phrae provincial railway station. In the olden days, the station was once used as a hub for various types of commodities, for example the shipping of wood,  heavy products, as well as loads of packages would be conveyed here, also it was a distribution centre to provinces in the immediate vicinity. During that time, the station master had more powers than the district chief.

The exact station building was renovated around 1957. The building constructed with the entire wooden structures, including ancient teak wood, was adjusted and extended to provide a larger usable area. It is transformed into a cemented building with structures like butterfly roofing and a spacious with lengthy platform to accommodate the utilities.

Den Chai Station is planned to be the junction for the Den Chai-Chiang Rai-Chiang Khong Railway Line.

Services 
 Special Express "Uttrawithi" no.9/10 Bangkok-Chiang Mai-Bangkok
 Special Express Diesel Car no.7/8 Bangkok-Chiang Mai-Bangkok
 Special Express no.13/14 Bangkok-Chiang Mai-Bangkok
 Express no.51/52 Bangkok-Chiang Mai-Bangkok
 Rapid no.107/112 Bangkok-Den Chai-Bangkok
 Rapid no.109/102 Bangkok-Chiang Mai-Bangkok
 Rapid no.111/108 Bangkok-Den Chai-Bangkok
 Local no.407/408 Nakhon Sawan-Chiang Mai-Nakhon Sawan

References
 
 

Railway stations in Thailand
Buildings and structures in Phrae province